Geng Shuai, dubbed the China's Useless Edison, is a Chinese village craftsman. He has more than 2.7 million followers on the Chinese short video app Kuaishou and almost a million followers on Weibo. Notable videos include 'a treadmill enclosed in a cage', that would open only when a selected amount of time had passed by.

References

External links 
"Geng Shuai, China's 'useless edison' mixes inventing and internet"

1987 births
Living people